Copalillo  is one of the 81 municipalities of Guerrero, in south-western Mexico. The municipal seat lies at Copalillo.  The municipality covers an area of 898.6 km².

As of 2005, the municipality had a total population of 13,747.

References

Municipalities of Guerrero